Gabriel-Madeleine-Camille Dareste de la Chavanne (22 November 1822, in Paris – 1899, in Paris)  was a French zoologist and specialist in experimental embryology.

He obtained his doctorate in medicine in 1847 and his doctorate in science in 1851. He worked at the University of Lille, where he was chair to the faculty of natural history from 1864 to 1872. In 1872 he was appointed professor of ichthyology and herpetology at the Museum d'Histoire Naturelle in Paris. He was named director of the laboratory of teratology, and from 1875, associated with the École des Hautes-études. He was awarded the grand prize in physiology by the Académie des sciences for the treatise Recherches sur la production artificielle de monstruosités (1877).

He was a founder of teratogeny, it being defined as the experimental study of conditions for the artificial production of monstrosities. Beginning in 1855, he purposely produced monstrous chick embryos by using "indirect methods" that exposed the egg to teratogenic factors — such as, implementing lowered incubation temperatures for several hours.

Selected works 
 Troisième mémoire sur les circonvolutions du cerveau chez les mammifères (1855) – Third memoire on convolutions of the brain in mammals.
 Note sur un nouveau genre de monstruosité double appartenant à la famille des polygnathiens (1859) – Note on a new kind of dual monstrosity belonging to the family of polygnathians
 Recherches sur la production artificielle des monstruosités, ou, Essais de Tératogénie expérimentale (1876) – Research on the artificial production of montrosities, or essays on experimental teratogeny.

References

External links 

 Comptes rendus hebdomadaires des séances de l'Académie des sciences, Volume 55, Académie des sciences (France) - CRAS 1862
 Louis Pasteur et Lille 1854-1857, Alain Gérard, Éditeur Institut Pasteur de Lille, 1995
 Archives de zoologie expérimentale et générale, Volume 1, Henri de Lacaze-Duthiers, 1872

1822 births
1899 deaths
19th-century French zoologists
French embryologists
Teratologists
Academic staff of the Lille University of Science and Technology
Scientists from Paris
National Museum of Natural History (France) people